Joaquín José Victor Bernaudo Giménez-Arnau Puente, better known as Jimmy Giménez-Arnau (born 14 September 1943 in Brazil) is a Spanish journalist, author and television personality.

Biography 
The son of the author and diplomat José Antonio Giménez-Arnau, and his wife María Inés Puente García-Arnaiz, Giménez-Arnau was born in Brazilian waters on the Spanish liner Cabo de Hornos. Between the ages of seven and nine, Giménez-Arnau studied in an English school, allowing him to achieve fluency in the language. He graduated in law and journalism, and took part in boxing and football in his youth, in addition to being an art seller.

As a journalist, he was the war correspondent for the satirical magazine Hermano Lobo, for which he wrote under the pseudonym "Jimmy Corso". In 1980, together with Julio Wizuete he directed, starred in and wrote the film Cocaína. In 1983 he created the television soap Onda Blúmini.

As a writer, he started to write poems and published Cuya selva ("Whose jungle") and La soledad distinta ("Distinct loneliness"). In 1977 he published his first novel, Las islas transparientes. In 2020, he published his autobiography, La vida jugada.

As a journalist, he presented the Antena 3 Radio show Hora de lobos, and on television he has appeared on shows such as the Telecinco shows La máquina de verdad and Sálvame, the regional chat show Tómbola, and the Antena 3 show Sabor a ti.

Controversies 
On 20 October 1993, on the Protagonistas radio chat show, Giménez-Arnau entered into a disagreement with the actress Norma Duval, during which Giménez-Arnau had criticised Ms. Duval. Duval eventually threw one of her shoes at Giménez-Arnau. Later on, Duval said she wanted to make peace with Giménez-Arnau, but so far he has not relented.

According to the newspaper El País, on 29 June 1994 Giménez-Arnau was detained by police on suspicion of drugs trafficking when leaving the Telecinco studios. The police seized 10 grams of cocaine, and his car was searched in case he were hiding more.

On 23 July 2009, Giménez-Arnau entered into a fight with sports journalist Pipi Estrada on the set of the Telecinco chat show Sálvame. Giménez-Arnau claimed Estrada had stepped on his head, but the courts sided with Estrada.

Personal life 
On 3 August 1977, Giménez-Arnau married María del Mar Martínez-Bordiu y Franco, the niece of Francisco Franco, whom he met at a party. They have a daughter, Leticia, however he has admitted he doesn't see her. During their marriage they lived in the Palace of Canto del Pico. Ten years later, he got together with a model, and in 1993 Giménez-Arnau and Martínez-Bordiu split. This immediately made him a figure of the tabloid press. Giménez-Arnau has used his status as a relative of the Francos to criticise the family, especially in his book Yo, Jimmy: La vida entre los Franco.

In April 2013, Giménez-Arnau married the journalist Sandra Salgado, 35 years his junior.

Television credits

References 

People born at sea
1943 births

Living people
Spanish television personalities
Spanish journalists